Ecdeiocolea monostachya is a species of grass-like plant in the family Ecdeiocoleaceae native to Western Australia. It was first described by Mueller in 1874. It is found in yellow sands over laterite in Western Australia.

References

Poales
Angiosperms of Western Australia
Poales of Australia
Plants described in 1874
Taxa named by Ferdinand von Mueller